Arcia is a surname. Notable people with the surname include:

Elizabeth Arcia (born 1997), Nicaraguan footballer
Francisco Arcia (born 1989), Venezuelan baseball player
José Arcia (1943–2016), Cuban baseball player
Orlando Arcia (born 1994), Venezuelan baseball player
Oswaldo Arcia (born 1991), Venezuelan baseball player